Orazio Michi "dell'Arpa" (also Mihi; Alife, Campania, 1594Rome, 26 October 1641) was an Italian composer, and, as his nickname "of the harp" suggests, harpist.

Works, editions and recordings
 3 instrumental pieces on The Harp of Luduvico I diletti di mundo. Quel signor. Su duro tronco. Andrew Lawrence-King CDH55264  Helios
 Piangete, afflitti lumi Jaroussky, Rial, Pluhar & L´Arpeggiata.
 Ninna nanna al bambino Gesù Jaroussky, Rial, Pluhar & L´Arpeggiata.

References

Italian Baroque composers
Italian harpists
1594 births
1641 deaths
17th-century Italian composers
Italian male classical composers
17th-century male musicians